The FIBA Oceania Under-17 Championship is an under-17 basketball championship in the International Basketball Federation's FIBA Oceania zone. 

Since 2017, the competition previously known as FIBA Oceania Under-18 Championship, which was a qualifier for the FIBA Under-19 Basketball World Cup, is now an under-17 competition for Oceania teams to qualify to the FIBA Asia Under-18 Championship (from which they can then qualify for the World Cup).

Summary

Oceania Under-18 Championship

Oceania Under-17 Championship

Performances by nation

Participation details

See also
 FIBA Oceania Under-15 Championship

References

 
Basketball competitions in Oceania between national teams
Oceania